James Fred Hofheinz (born March 15, 1938) is an American lawyer and politician who served as mayor of Houston, Texas, from 1974 to 1978.

Hofheinz's father, Roy, was mayor of the city in the 1950s.

Hofheinz graduated from Lamar High School in Houston, where he was a championship debater and also lettered in track and field. He attended the University of Texas, earning a Bachelor of Arts summa cum laude in 1960 and continued at Texas to earn both Master of Arts and Doctor of Philosophy degrees in economics.  Hofheinz earned a Juris Doctor from the University of Houston in 1964. In 1974 Hofheinz was named one of "200 Faces for the Future" by Time.

After his term as mayor, Hofheinz practiced law in Houston. He also served as a board member at Lucas Energy, an independent crude oil and gas company.  In 1971, Hofheinz co-founded the closed circuit television company Top Rank. Hofheinz ran again for mayor in 1989, but was defeated by the incumbent mayor, Kathy Whitmire.

In 1994, Hofheinz was the sole shareholder of Top Rank when it attempted to purchase the Minnesota Timberwolves and move them to New Orleans. The deal fell through when NBA owners voted unanimously to reject the sale, citing concerns about the firmness of Top Rank's finances.

Hofheinz currently resides in Houston, and was an attorney in the law firm of Williams, Birnberg & Andersen L.L.P.

References

External links 
 Hofheinz, Mayor Fred and Frank Michel. Mayor Fred Hofheinz Oral History, Houston Oral History Project, February 11, 2008.

1938 births
Living people
People from Houston
Mayors of Houston
Lamar High School (Houston, Texas) alumni
University of Houston alumni
Texas lawyers
Texas Democrats